uwu, also stylized as UwU, is an emoticon representing a cute face. The u characters represent closed eyes, while the w represents a mouth. It is used to express various warm, happy, or affectionate feelings.

Usage and variants 
uwu is often used to denote cuteness, happiness, or tenderness. Excessive usage of the emoticon can also have the intended effect of annoying its recipient. The emoticon has been popular in the furry fandom. 

uwu also has a more surprised and sometimes allusive variant, owo (or OwO; also associated with the furry fandom and often the response, "what's this?") that may also denote cuteness, as well as curiosity and perplexion. owo originated in 2016, and gained popularity in 2018; as opposed to uwu, the o characters represent open eyes. It is also sometimes used for trolling.

History 
uwu is known to date back as far as 2005, in an anime fanfiction. The origin of the word is unknown, with many people believing it to originate in Internet chat rooms. By 2014, the emoticon had spread across the Internet into Tumblr, becoming an Internet subculture.

The word uwu is included in the Royal Spanish Academy's word observatory, defined as an "emoticon used to show happiness or tenderness".

Notable uses
In 2018, the official Twitter account tweeted "uwu" in response to a tweet by an artist.

In 2020, the U.S. Army Esports Twitter account tweeted "uwu" in reply to a tweet by Discord, which was met by significant backlash from Twitter users.

See also
List of emoticons

Notes

References

External links

 

Emoticons
Furry fandom
Internet memes introduced in 2005
2005 neologisms